The Lace-Maker is an oil on canvas painting by the Dutch painter Gabriël Metsu, created c. 1663. It is an example of Dutch Golden Age painting and is part of the collection of Gemäldegalerie Alte Meister, in Dresden.

Description
The woman is looking at the viewer and on her lap is a lace pillow for bobbin lace. It is one of the Metsu paintings with the longest provenance in any collection today, first recorded in 1722.

This painting was documented by Hofstede de Groot in 1914, who wrote; "79. THE LACE-MAKER. Sm. 112. In a room with an oil-painting on the grey wall, a lady is seated at work with a lace pillow on her lap. She wears a grey satin dress and a blue jacket trimmed with white fur. At her feet to the left is a cat. 
Signed in full in the centre at the top ; panel, 14 inches by 10 inches. 
In the Saxon inventory of 1722, A531. 
Now in the Picture Gallery, Dresden, 1902 catalogue, No. 1736."

Popular culture
In 1959 this painting was featured on a stamp in the East Germany.

References

External links
 Die Dame mit dem Klöppelkissen in the Bildindex der Kunst und Architektur
 The Lace Maker, 1663 in the RKD

1663 paintings
Collections of the Gemäldegalerie Alte Meister
Paintings of lacemakers
Paintings by Gabriël Metsu
Cats in art
Genre paintings